Events from the year 1841 in Ireland

Events
6 June – 1841 census of Ireland: the first thorough census is completed and the population of Ireland is calculated to be just under 8.2 million.
1 November – Daniel O'Connell is elected as the first Roman Catholic Lord Mayor of Dublin in centuries.
3 November – foundation stone for Saint Malachy's Church, Belfast is laid (completed in 1844).
Ennis Friary refounded by Franciscans.
The Cork Examiner newspaper is founded by John Francis Maguire in support of the Catholic Emancipation and tenant rights work of Daniel O'Connell.
Ulster Canal completed.
Anthony Trollope moves to Ireland as an official of the General Post Office, initially settling in Banagher.

Arts and literature
Charles Lever's novel Charles O'Malley, the Irish Dragoon is published in Dublin.

Births
12 February – Windham Wyndham-Quin, 4th Earl of Dunraven and Mount-Earl, peer (died 1926).
 30 April – Charles Cooper Penrose-Fitzgerald, admiral in the Royal Navy (died 1921).
31 August – Patrick Egan, treasurer of the Irish Land League, fled to the United States, United States Minister to Chile (died 1919).
10 September – Max Arthur Macauliffe, British administrator, scholar and author (died 1913).
31 October – Abraham Dowdney, United States Representative from New York and officer in the Union army in the American Civil War (died 1886).
5 December – Marcus Daly, businessman in America (died 1900).
22 December – Thomas McCarthy Fennell, Fenian political prisoner transported to Western Australia (died 1914).
Full date unknown
Patrick Buckley, soldier, lawyer, statesman, and judge in New Zealand (died 1896).
Rosa Mulholland, novelist, short-story writer and poet (died 1921).
Charles Anderson Read, journalist, novelist and anthologist (died 1878).

Deaths
7 January – James Arthur O'Connor, painter (born 1792).
17 March – Tyrone Power, actor, comedian, author and theatrical manager (born 1797).
18 April – Somerset Lowry-Corry, 2nd Earl Belmore, politician and statesman (born 1774).
21 July – Price Blackwood, 4th Baron Dufferin and Claneboye, Royal Navy captain (born 1794).
24 August – Thomas Hopkirk, botanist (born 1785 in Scotland).
11 November – Catherine McAuley, nun (born 1778).

References

 
Years of the 19th century in Ireland
1840s in Ireland
Ireland
 Ireland